Nueva Helvecia is a city in Colonia Department of Uruguay.

It is a few kilometres from the coast where the Atlantic Ocean meets the Río de la Plata and east of Buenos Aires, Argentina. It is known nationwide for its Swiss heritage.

History

Swiss emigration
Europe was undergoing severe economic hardships during the second part of the 19th century. The Industrial Revolution affected many small artisans and family businesses. By law, Swiss mercenary soldiers could no longer fight for other countries and were returning home to find their families in precarious conditions that could not support any more members.

The Americas represented a chance for progress and prosperity. Many Swiss came to North America during the California Gold Rush, but once the Civil War started in the United States, the Swiss emigrants started looking further south in Argentina, Brazil and Uruguay for a better future. In Brazil there was a law that foreigners could not own land. In Argentina the colonists settled in indigenous territory and were not welcome, but Uruguay's government had a relatively open immigration policy. They were desperate to populate the country, which had but a few inhabitants at the time. The Swiss colony was given autonomy, and the first democratic secret vote in Uruguay happened in Colonia Suiza. The Swiss immigrants helped shape many Uruguayan laws, giving Uruguay the name of "Switzerland of the Americas", among many other contributions such as the classical production of Swiss cheese, also known as "Queso Colonia".

Settlement
The first Swiss settler was David Salomon Bratschi from Bern. He arrived in 1858, three years earlier than the first large group of settlers who arrived at the end of 1861.

However, the day of Nueva Helvecia's foundation is considered to be 24 April 1862. This date marks the time when a large number of immigrants, mostly from Switzerland, but with a significant number from Austria, Germany, Italy and France, settled in the area. The foundations of Colonia Suiza, Colonia Valdense, Colonia Miguelete, Rosario and other towns are the consequences of this European immigration. The name "Nueva Helvecia" was given to "Colonia Suiza" some decades later.

The arrival of Swiss, Austrian, Italian, French, and German immigrants was important to the subsequent political organization of a country that was receptive to foreign influences. Uruguay offered a range of alternatives to immigrants, like fertile lands for agriculture and grassland for livestock productivity.

Culture

The people of Nueva Helvecia have maintained Swiss traditions and customs to this day. There are several groups, including "Los Alegres Alpinos", and the "Alpenveilchen Grupo de Danzas", who still practice the songs and dances of their ancestors.

However, today, very few Nueva Helvecia residents speak the language of their ancestors, likely due to intermarriage with other populations. Even among Swiss the different dialects prevented them from communicating with each other unless they used the Spanish language.

The holidays and festivities include:
 The 25th of April, corresponding to the anniversary of the foundation of Nueva Helvecia
 The 1st of August, corresponding to the anniversary of the formation of the Swiss Confederation.
 The "Bierfest" in December attracts visitors from other departments and countries.

Architecture
The city, though located in Uruguay, shares a number of features and similarities with classical and early modern European architecture, mainly those of Switzerland, Germany and France, as a result of its close link with the cultures and societies of those countries. Unlike in other cities in Uruguay, every building bears a symbolic shield representing the different Swiss cantons where the family living in the house came from. This has become more evident in recent years.

Attractions
Plaza de los Fundadores
Tiro Suizo
Hotel Suizo
OSE Watertank
Molino Quemado
Evangelical Congregation of Nueva Helvecia (Evangelical Church of the River Plate)
Most Holy Trinity Parish Church (Roman Catholic)
Our Lady of Schoenstatt Chapel, a popular Roman Catholic pilgrimage sanctuary
Cine Helvético

Economy

Dairy products, including milk, Swiss cheese, cream cheese, dulce de leche, and yogurt, dominate the city's economy. Nueva Helvecia also produces a variety of sausages and animal products, fruits and vegetables, cereals and wine.

Until 1980 the Facansa enterprise produced bodywork for road vehicles.

Location and population

It is located in the southeastern part of Colonia Department, Uruguay. Its population, as of 2004, was 12,000.

Notable people

 Franco Israel, (born 2000), professional footballer
 Pedro Ignacio Wolcan Olano, (born 1953) bishop of Tacuarembó
 Rodrigo Bentancur (born 1997), association football player
 Jorge Meyer Long (born 1949), diplomat
 Horacio Troche (1935-2014), association football player and trainer
 Nibia Sabalsagaray (1949-1974), educator killed during the Uruguayan dictatorship

Sources

Aschwanden, Prisca: Die schweizerische Einwanderung in Uruguay zwischen 1880-1929, Lizentiatsarbeit, Universität Zürich, 1990.
Caro, Marice.: Los Bratschi en el Río de la Plata. David Salomón Bratschi, el primer colono suizo en la colonia agrícola de Nueva Helvecia. 
Caro, Marice Ettlin.: The Swiss Colony of Uruguay. David Salomon Bratschi, the first settler of "Nueva Helvecia". 
Caro, Marice Ettlin.: La Genealogia de los Ettlin, del canton de Unterwalden a la Americas. 
Caro, Marice Ettlin.: The Ettlin Genealogy, from the Canton of Unterwalden to the Americas. 
Caro, Marice Ettlin.: La Colonia Suiza que casi no lo fue: Nueva Helvecia. 
Caro, Marice Ettlin.: Bienvenidos a Nueva Helvecia. 
Wirth, Juan Carlos F.: Historia de la Iglesia Evangélica de Nueva Helvecia, 1944.
Wirth, Juan Carlos F.: Colonia Suiza hace 80 años, 1947.
Wirth, Juan Carlos F.: Historia de colonia suiza [de l'Uruguay], ed. por el Comité Ejucutivo pro-festejos del centenario de Colonia Suiza, Nueva Helvecia, 1962.
Wirth, Juan Carlos F.: Del Havre al Río de la Plata en 47 días, 1974.
Wirth, Juan Carlos F.: Génesis de la colonia agrícola suiza Nueva Helvecia: historia, documentos y carografia, Ministerio de Educación y Cultura, Montevideo, 1980.
Zbinden, Carl: Die schweizerische Auswanderung nach Argentinien, Uruguays, Chili und Paraguay, dissertation, Universität Bern, Affoltern a. A., 1931.
Ziegler, Sonia; Naón, Ignacio: Suizos en Uruguay, 224 pp., Montevideo, febrero de 2007. 
Ziegler, Sonia .: Pequeña historias de Grandes mujeres. La historia de la Colonia Suiza en Uruguay a través de sus mujeres.

References

External links

Nueva Helvecia in Swiss Info - 
Guía turística de Colonia - 
 

Populated places in the Colonia Department
Populated places established in 1862
Swiss immigration to Uruguay
1862 establishments in Uruguay